Come On In may refer to:
Come On In, a 1998 album by R. L. Burnside
"Come On In", a song by The Association on their 1968 album Birthday
"Come On In", a song by Rick Nelson from his live album In Concert at the Troubadour, 1969
"Come On In", a song written by Bobby Braddock and first released by Jerry Lee Lewis on his 1977 album Country Memories
"Come On In" (The Oak Ridge Boys song), a 1978 song by The Oak Ridge Boys from the album Room Service
"Come On In (You Did the Best You Could Do)", a 1986 unrelated song by The Oak Ridge Boys from the album Step On Out
"Come On In", a song by The Blues Band on their 1979 album The Official Blues Band Bootleg Album
"Come On In", a song by Sparklehorse on their 1998 album Good Morning Spider
"Come On In", a song featuring Akon on Sean Garrett's 2008 debut album Turbo 919
Come On In!, a book of poetry by Charles Bukowski, published in 2006
Come On In (film), a 1918 American comedy silent film
 Come On In (album), a 1998 remix album by Delta blues guitarist R. L. Burnside

See also
Come On (disambiguation)